Für einen Tag is the fifth studio album by German singer Helene Fischer. It was released on 14 October 2011 by EMI.

Track listing

Charts

Weekly charts

Year-end charts

Certifications

References

External links
 Helene-Fischer.de — official site

2011 albums